Graphik Dimensions Ltd is an American fine art decor manufacturer that produces five different private brands: pictureframes.com, Qowalla, USA Salvage, Graphik Hospitality, and Mirror Shop. The corporate headquarters are located in High Point, North Carolina.

Under their five brands, they sell a selection of framing, mirrors, and printing services. The largest, pictureframes.com, operates as a retail ecommerce site offering the largest selection of picture frames online, including custom frames, metal frames, and frames to hold canvas.

History
Founders Joan and Steve Feinsod began making frames for their own artwork. Other artists in the community began requesting frames as well, and before long, Graphik Dimensions Ltd. was founded in their Queens, NY home in 1965.

After a few years, the operation outgrew their den and moved to a warehouse space in Flushing, NY. In 1978, they hired their first official employee.

In the early 1980s, they printed and distributed their first catalog. On March 18, 1989 the company purchased its first mainframe computer.

In 1992, the company relocated to High Point, NC.

In 1997, they started the first private brand pictureframes.com, with a single web page, where interested customers could request a catalog. In 1999, they added custom online frame ordering.

In 2005, Steve & Joan stepped down from running the business, and their daughters Lauri & Robyn Feinsod stepped in. Lauri Feinsod filled the position of CEO and instated the company's C4 (Consciousness, Creativity, Collaboration, Community) values-driven culture.

Sustainability
The company became a zero landfill facility in April 2015.

The company also vows to a number of sustainability initiatives on their website. This includes a sourcing initiative that, wherever possible, sources eco-responsible materials and purchases products domestically to decrease carbon footprint. They have also co-developed eco-friendlier packaging materials.

In addition, there is a waste conscious initiative that has reduced waste per order by 66%, reduced trash hauls, and found ways to repurpose materials in the organization and community.

Finally, their consumption initiative includes actions like recycling all of the materials from their headquarters expansion, installing more energy-efficient HVAC units, and activating paperless payroll.

References

Manufacturing companies based in North Carolina
Picture framing